Ellsworth is an unincorporated community in the Township Of Lynch in Texas County, in the U.S. state of Missouri.

History
A post office called Ellsworth was established in 1846, and remained in service until 1876. The town community is named in honour of Mr. Ellsworth, a local merchant who often visited the town.

Neighbouring Towns

The closest towns to Ellsworth are Licking, Missouri which is 9.1 miles away, Houston, Missouri which is 9.3 miles away and Plato, Missouri which is 12.2 miles away.

References

Unincorporated communities in Texas County, Missouri
Unincorporated communities in Missouri